Bjarte Håkon Myrhol (born 29 May 1982) is a former Norwegian handballer, previously playing for THW Kiel and Norway men's national handball team.

Bjarte Myrhol was the captain of the Norway national team from 2014 to 2021.

At the end of his contract with Rhein-Neckar Löwen his jersey number 18 was retired by the club.

In 2021 he decided to end his career. On 3 June 2022 it was announced he’d make a comeback and join THW Kiel for the rest of the season because of injuries in their squad.

Individual awards 
All-Star Pivot of the World Championship: 2017, 2019

References

External links
 
 
 Bjarte Myrhol at the Norwegian Handball Federation 
 
 
 

1982 births
Living people
Handball players from Oslo
Norwegian male handball players
Expatriate handball players
Norwegian expatriate sportspeople in Denmark
Norwegian expatriate sportspeople in Hungary
Norwegian expatriate sportspeople in Germany
Rhein-Neckar Löwen players
HSG Nordhorn-Lingen players
Handball-Bundesliga players
Veszprém KC players
Handball players at the 2020 Summer Olympics
Olympic handball players of Norway